Rosenbauer Panther is a model of airport crash tender produced by Austrian manufacturer Rosenbauer.

It exists as 4x4, 6x6 and 8x8 version.

The eight-wheel drive version accommodates 14,500 litres (3,830 gallons) of fire extinguishing agents and a maximum speed of 140 km/h (87 mph), with an operating weight of 40 tons.

In the film Transformers: Dark of the Moon Sentinel Prime's alternate mode is a Rosenbauer Panther.

See also
 Rosenbauer Simba

References

External links

Official description

Fire service vehicles
Aircraft rescue and firefighting